Royal Air Force Wratting Common or more simply RAF Wratting Common is a former Royal Air Force station located near Newmarket, Suffolk, UK.

History

The following units were here at some point:
 No. 24 Heavy Glider Maintenance Section
 No. 90 Squadron RAF
 No. 195 Squadron RAF
 No. 273 Maintenance Unit RAF
 No. 1552 Radio Aids Training Flight No. 2 Section
 No. 1651 Heavy Conversion Unit RAF

References

Royal Air Force stations of World War II in the United Kingdom
Wratting Common